Kim Moon-hwan (born 1 August 1995) is a South Korean professional footballer who plays as a right-back for K League 1 club Jeonbuk Hyundai Motors and the South Korea national team.

Club career

Kim played college football for Chung-Ang University.

Kim signed with Busan IPark on 3 January 2017.
He was a regular starter for Busan in his first professional season, playing in a number of positions, including winger, wing-back and full-back.

In 2018, under new coach Choi Yun-kyum, Kim played more frequently at left-back and right-back. Despite only making 18 league starts, he was named in the K League 2 Best XI at the end of the season. The following year, Kim played almost exclusively at right-back under new coach Cho Deok-je. He was a regular fixture in the team that achieved promotion to the K League 1, and Kim was named in the league's Best XI for the second season in succession.

Kim signed with Los Angeles FC on 11 January 2021.

On 18 March 2022, Kim transferred to K League 1 side Jeonbuk Hyundai Motors.

International career
In 2018, Kim featured for the Korea Under-23 team in both the AFC U-23 Championship and the Asian Games. Korea were victorious in the latter, earning Kim and his teammates exemption from military service.

Kim's impressive performances at right-back earned him a full international call-up in September 2018. He made his debut as a substitute in a 2-0 win over Costa Rica on 7 September, and his first start came in the AFC Asian Cup against China on 16 January 2019.

Kim was named in South Korea's final squad for the 2022 World Cup in Qatar. Kim played every minute of Korea's campaign as they progressed from the group stage and exited at the Round of 16 after a 4-1 defeat to Brazil.

Club career statistics
As of 12 March 2023

Honours

Club 
Jeonbuk Hyundai Motors
 Korean FA Cup: 2022

South Korea U23
 Asian Games: 2018

Individual
 K League 2 Best XI: 2018, 2019

References

External links 
 

1995 births
Living people
People from Hwaseong, Gyeonggi
Association football midfielders
South Korean footballers
Busan IPark players
Los Angeles FC players
K League 2 players
Footballers at the 2018 Asian Games
Asian Games medalists in football
Asian Games gold medalists for South Korea
Medalists at the 2018 Asian Games
South Korea under-20 international footballers
South Korea under-23 international footballers
South Korea international footballers
2019 AFC Asian Cup players
Expatriate soccer players in the United States
Major League Soccer players
Sportspeople from Gyeonggi Province
2022 FIFA World Cup players